Albert Acevedo (born May 6, 1983) is a Chilean footballer who currently plays as a defender for Magallanes.

Career

O'Higgins

In 2014, he won the Supercopa de Chile against Deportes Iquique.

He participated with the club in the 2014 Copa Libertadores where they faced Deportivo Cali, Cerro Porteño and Lanús, being third and being eliminated in the group stage.

International career
Acevedo was born in Conchalí. As a youth, he participated for Chile in the South American U-20 Championship 2003.

Personal life

Honours

Club
Universidad Católica
Primera División (2): 2002 Apertura, 2005 Clausura

Universidad de Chile
Primera División (3): 2011 Apertura, 2011 Clausura, 2012 Apertura
Copa Chile (1): 2012–13 
Copa Sudamericana (1): 2011

O'Higgins
Supercopa de Chile (1): 2014

References

External links

1983 births
Living people
Chilean people of Basque descent
Footballers from Santiago
Chilean footballers
Chile under-20 international footballers
Chile international footballers
Unión Española footballers
Club Deportivo Universidad Católica footballers
Cobreloa footballers
O'Higgins F.C. footballers
Universidad de Chile footballers
Deportes Magallanes footballers
Magallanes footballers
Chilean Primera División players
Primera B de Chile players
Association football defenders
Chilean football managers
People from Santiago Province, Chile